Raymond Depardon (born 6 July 1942) is a French photographer, photojournalist and documentary filmmaker.

Early life
Depardon was born in Villefranche-sur-Saône, France.

Photographer
Depardon is a mainly self-taught photographer, as he began taking pictures on his family's farm when he was 12. He apprenticed with a photographer-optician in Villefranche-sur-Saône before he moved to Paris in 1958. He began his career as a photojournalist in the early 1960s. He travelled to conflict zones including Algeria, Vietnam, Biafra and Chad. In 1966, Depardon co-founded the photojournalism agency Gamma. In 1973 he became Gamma's director. From 1975 to 1977, Depardon traveled in Chad. The following year, he left Gamma to become a Magnum Photos associate, then a full member in 1979. In the 1990s, Depardon returned to his parents' farm to photograph rural landscapes in color and, in 1996, published a black and white road journal, In Africa. 

In May 2012, he took the official portrait of French President François Hollande.

Director
Depardon is also the author of several documentary shorts and feature films. His approach as a director is influenced by cinéma vérité and direct cinema. In 1969 he made his first film (about Jan Palach) and he has directed 16 films since then. In 1984 Depardon made his first fiction film, Empty Quarters. Other notable examples include 1974, une partie de campagne, on the 1974 presidential campaign of Valéry Giscard d'Estaing, Reporters (1981) and New York, N.Y. (1986), La captive du désert (1990) and Caught in the Acts (Délits flagrants) (1994).

Publications
Beyrouth, Centre Ville: inédit. Points. 
Paysans. Contemporary French Fiction. 
San Clemente. Diffusion Weber, 1984. 
En Afrique. Seuil, 1996. 
Errance. Seuil, 2000. 
Le Tour Du Monde En 14 Jours. 7 Escales, 1 Visa. 2008. 
La terre des paysans. Seuil, 2008. 
Manhattan Out. Steidl Photography International, 2009. 
Native Land. Fondation Cartier pour l'art contemporain, Paris. 2009. 
La France de Raymond Depardon. Seuil, 2010. 
Repérages. Seuil, 2012. 
Berlin.  Seuil, 2014. 
Adieu Saigon. Steidl, 2015. 
Glasgow. Seuil, 2016. 
La Solitude Heureuse Du Voyageur: Précédé De Notes. Points, 2017. 
Bolivia. Thames & Hudson, 2018. 
Le Desert Americain. Hazan, 2019. 
Manicomio: Secluded Madness
Paris Journal
PPP: Photographies De Personnalités Politiques
Afriques
villes, cities, städte
Désert, Un Homme Sans L'occident
Un moment si doux
Depardon Voyages
Détours
La ferme du Garet
Return to Vietnam
Depardon Cinéma
100 Photos Pour Defendre La Liberté De La Presse

Filmography
Venezuela (1963)
Israel (1967)
Biafra (1968)
Jan Palach (1969/I) 
Tchad 1: L'embuscade (1970) 
Yemen: Arabie heureuse (1973) 
 (1974)
Tchad 2 (1975)
Tibesti Too (1976)
Tchad 3 (1976)
Dix minutes de silence pour John Lennon (1980) 
 (1980)
 (1981)
Piparsod (1982/I)
 (1982)
News Items (1983) (French: Faits divers)
 (1984) 
 (1985) 
 (1986)
 (1988)
Le Petit Navire (1988) – short film
Une histoire très simple (1989)
 (1990) 
Captive of the Desert (French: La captive du désert (1990)  (1991) (segment "Pour Alirio de Jesus Pedraza Becerra, Colombie") (1990) – short filmCartagena (1993) – short filmFace à la mer (1993) – short filmMontage (1994) (1994)  (1995) (segment "Prom, La'")Paroles d'appelés (1995) – short filmLa Prom' (1995) – short filmLumière and Company (1995) (French: Lumière et compagnie)Malraux (1996) (1996) Amour (1997) – short film (1998)Bolivie (1998) – short film made with Claudine Nougaret (1998) – vidéo clip de Véronique Sanson (1999) (1949-1999 : Emmaüs a 50 ans) (1999)Déserts (2000) – short filmProfils paysans:  = Profiles farmers: the approach (2001) (2002)Chasseurs et Chamans (2003) – short filmQuoi de neuf au Garet? (2004) (2004) Profils paysans:  = Profiles farmers: the daily life (2005)To Each His Own Cinema (French: Chacun son cinéma ou Ce petit coup au coeur quand la lumière s'éteint et que le film commence) (2007)  – a collection of short films, Depardon's contribution being Cinéma d'été (Open-Air Cinema)Cinéma d'été (2007) – short filmProfils paysans:  = Profiles farmers: modern life (2008) (English: Modern Life)Donner la parole (2008)La France de Raymond Depardon (2010) – short film made with 
Au bonheur des maths (2011) – short film made with Nougaret
 (2012)
 (2016)
 (2017)

Awards for films

1979: George Sadoul Prize for Numéro Zéro
Winner, César Award for best short documentary for Reporters (1981)
Winner, César Award for best short documentary for New York, N.Y. (1986)
La captive du désert (1990) was nominated for the Palme d'Or at the 1990 Cannes Film Festival,
Winner, best feature documentary at the César Awards for Caught in the Acts (Délits flagrants) (1994)
Joris Ivens award, Caught in the Acts (Délits flagrants) (1994) the International Documentary Film Festival Amsterdam
Caught in the Acts (Délits flagrants) (1994) Vancouver International Film Festival
2000: Dragon of Dragons, a lifetime achievement award, Kraków Film Festival

References

External links 

La Place et le Photographe documentary film by Arno Gaillard, 1991, 4 minutes

1942 births
Living people
People from Villefranche-sur-Saône
French photojournalists
French documentary film directors
Magnum photographers
Paris Match writers